Eupithecia hilariata is a moth in the family Geometridae. It is found in Afghanistan, Turkmenistan (the Kugitang Mountains), Uzbekistan (the Karzhan Tau Mountains and Chimgan Mountains), Tajikistan (the Pamirs Mountains), Kyrgyzstan (the Tien-Shan Mountains), the mountains of southern and south-eastern Kazakhstan and north-western China  (Xinjiang).

References

Moths described in 1908
hilariata
Moths of Asia